The 1905 Canadian football season was the 14th season of organized play since the Canadian Rugby Union (CRU) was founded in 1892 and the 23rd season since the creation of the Ontario Rugby Football Union (ORFU) and the Quebec Rugby Football Union (QRFU) in 1883. The season concluded with the Toronto University team defeating the Ottawa Rough Riders in the 1905 Dominion Championship game.

Canadian football news in 1905
The Intercollegiate and Quebec Unions refused the Burnside Rules. For championship games, the CRU ruled the teams would use QRFU rules for the first half and the intercollegiate rules for the second half.

QRFU moved to four 15-minute quarters; Tries worth five points and Goals from Tries worth one point. CIRFU adopted 10-yard rule for three downs and the ORFU gave captains the option of playing four 15-minute quarters. Goals from the Field were increased to three points and the Fair Catch rule was replaced by a three-yard Punt Return rule.

The Toronto Football Club merged with the Toronto Argonauts in 1905, with W. A. Hewitt serving as manager. He also served as vice-president of the ORFU for the 1905 and 1906 seasons, and sought for uniform rules of play with the CRU, with a preference for the snap-back system of play used in Ontario.

Regular season

Final regular season standings
Note: GP = Games Played, W = Wins, L = Losses, T = Ties, PF = Points For, PA = Points Against, Pts = Points
Bold text means that they have clinched the playoffs

League Champions

Playoffs
The ORFU champion Hamilton Tigers refused to play in Ottawa for the Dominion Semi-Final, so they were banned from the championship final by the CRU.

Dominion Championship

References

 
Canadian Football League seasons